Thenmala railway station (code: TNML) is a railway station in Kollam, Kerala, and falls under the Madurai railway division of the Southern Railway zone, Indian Railways.

References

Madurai railway division
Railway stations opened in 1904
tenmala